Gedintailor is a crofting village, lying on the shores of the Narrows of Raasay on the east coast of the island of Skye in Scotland and is in the council area of Highland.

References

Populated places in the Isle of Skye